Producer or producers may refer to:

Occupations
Producer (agriculture), a farm operator
A stakeholder of economic production
Film producer, supervises the making of films
Executive producer, contributes to a film's budget and usually does not work on set
Line producer, manager during daily operations of a film or TV series
News producer, compiles all items of a news programme into a cohesive show
Online producer, oversees the making of content for websites
Radio producer, oversees the making of a radio show
Record producer, manages sound recording 
Television producer, oversees all aspects of video production on a television program
Theatrical producer, oversees the staging of theatre productions
Video game producer, in charge of overseeing development of a video game
Impresario, a producer or manager in the theatre and music industries

Film and television works
The Producers (1967 film), black comedy by Mel Brooks
The Producers (2005 film), American musical comedy film based on 1967 film of the same name
The Producers (TV series), 2015 South Korean television series
"The Producer", an episode of Gilligan's Island

Other uses
Primary producer or autotroph, an organism that synthesizes energy-rich organic compounds
Producers (band), English rock band
The Producers (musical), a 1967 musical theatrical adaptation (and book) of the film

See also
Producerism, a political ideology